The British Journal of Social and Clinical Psychology was a peer-reviewed academic journal published by the British Psychological Society established in 1962. In 1981, it was split in two publications:
 British Journal of Social Psychology
 British Journal of Clinical Psychology

Psychology journals
Publications established in 1962